Turun Urheiluliitto (TuUL) is a sports club from Turku, Finland that was founded in 1901. The club includes sports teams for cross-country skiing, bowling, volleyball, ice skating, boxing, cycling, triathlon, gymnastics, and track and field.

The club's most successful athlete is still Paavo Nurmi. The club has also been represented by the following Olympic medalists: Hannes Kolehmainen, Harri Larva, Raimo Heinonen, Veikko Karvonen, and Kaisa Parviainen.

Season to season

References

External links
The club's website (Finnish)

Sport in Finland
Sports clubs established in 1901